John Philipps Kenyon, FBA (18 June 1927 – 6 January 1996) was an English historian and Fellow of the British Academy. His area of expertise was 17th-century England.

Life
Kenyon was born in Sheffield where he attended King Edward VII School, Sheffield and then University of Sheffield where he obtained a first class degree in History in 1948 before going to Cambridge to take a doctorate as a pupil of John H. Plumb. He obtained his doctorate in 1954 and was appointed a fellow of Christ's College, Cambridge, before going on to become Hull's history professor for 19 years, followed by six years at St Andrews. From 1987 to 1994 he was Distinguished Professor of early modern British history at the University of Kansas. For many years he was a regular reviewer for The Observer.

Works
 Robert Spencer, Earl of Sunderland (1958)
 The Stuarts (1958)
 The Stuart Constitution, 1603-1688 (1966)
 The Popish Plot (1972)
 Revolution Principles: The Politics of Party 1689-1720 (1977)
 Stuart England (1978)
 The History Men (1983)
 The Civil Wars of England (1988)

References

1927 births
1996 deaths
People educated at King Edward VII School, Sheffield
Academics of the University of Hull
Academics of the University of St Andrews
University of Kansas faculty
Fellows of Christ's College, Cambridge
Fellows of the British Academy
20th-century British historians